Demidov Island is a small island  north of the mouth of Rayner Glacier and  southwest of the Hydrographer Islands along the coast of Enderby Land. It appears that the island was mapped by both the Australian National Antarctic Research Expeditions and the Soviet expedition in 1957. It was named by the Soviet expedition for Lieutenant Dimitri Demidov of the Russian expedition of 1819–21 under Fabian Gottlieb von Bellingshausen.

See also 
 List of Antarctic and sub-Antarctic islands

References

Islands of Enderby Land